Huaqing Pool, or the Huaqing Hot Springs, are a complex of hot springs located in an area characterized by mild weather and scenic views at the northern foot of Mount Li, one of the three major peaks of the Qinling.

History
The spring used the locally-occurring geothermal heating and features a long documented history of almost three millennia, having served as the location for several palaces built during the reigns of past Chinese dynastic rulers, including King You of the Zhou dynasty, Qin Shi Huang of the Qin dynasty, and an expanded version by Wu Han of the Han dynasty.

Under the Tang emperors Taizong and Xuanzong, with the latter had the structure rebuilt in 723 as part of the Huaqing Palace, and is famous as the supposed scene of Xuanzong's romance with his consort Yang Guifei. However, during the events associated with the An Lushan rebellion, considerable damage was done to the site. Nevertheless, the historical legacy of the Huaqing pools has received lasting commemoration, such as in the following mention of Emperor Xuanzong and Yang in Bai Juyi's poem Song of Everlasting Regret:

On a cold spring day, he bestowed upon her the honor of bathing with him at the Huaqing pools,	
According to legend, this is the pool that was used by Yang Guifei and the emperor.
The waters of the hot springs were smooth, and washed over her pale white skin.
The palace maids helped her to leave the pool, because she was too delicate and lacked strength.
This was when she began to receive the emperor's advances.

This site was also the scene of the 1936 Xi'an Incident, when Chiang Kai-shek was kidnapped by former warlord Chang Hsüeh-liang and forced to participate in a United Front with the Chinese Communist Party to oppose Japanese encroachment on China.

Present
Huaqing Pool is currently an important tourist spot, classified as a AAAAA scenic area by the China National Tourism Administration.

Gallery

References

External links

  (English subtitle)

Chinese poetry allusions
Tang dynasty
Hot springs of China
Major National Historical and Cultural Sites in Shaanxi
AAAAA-rated tourist attractions
Ponds of China